John "JG" Goetchius is an American keyboardist, best known for his work with Boston ska-core band The Mighty Mighty Bosstones.

Career
Born and raised in Massachusetts, Goetchius played keys for a number of Boston bands throughout the 1980s and 1990s, including The Dogmatics, Matweeds and Atomic Cocktail. He was also a member of the ska band Mission Impossible, who made their recorded debut alongside The Mighty Mighty Bosstones on the 1987 ska compilation Mash It Up!. Goetchius first recorded with the Bosstones on their 1995 album Question the Answers, and since continues to contribute keyboards for the band's albums and occasionally their live shows. He recorded organ for the majority of tracks on the Bosstones' 2009 album Pin Points and Gin Joints and has recently made continued appearances in the band's concerts, television performances and publicity photos, though has not yet been confirmed as an official member.

In 1998, Goetchius joined the Oregon ska-swing band and former Bosstones tourmates the Cherry Poppin' Daddies following the departure of their previous keyboardist Dustin Lanker. Goetchius served as a member of the Daddies during the peak of the band's commercial popularity, recording on much of their Soul Caddy album until Lanker's return in early 2000.

Discography

The Mighty Mighty Bosstones
Question the Answers (1995) – organ, piano
Pay Attention (2000) – keyboards
Pin Points and Gin Joints (2009) – organ, keyboards, piano
The Magic of Youth (2011) – piano, Hammond organ
While We're At It (2018) - keyboards
When God Was Great (2021) - keyboards

Cherry Poppin' Daddies
Soul Caddy (2000) – keyboards, backing vocals

Miscellaneous
The Dogmatics – Everybody Does It (1986) – keyboards
Mission Impossible – Mash It Up! compilation (1987) – keyboards
Mission Impossible – Ska-Ville USA Vol. 2 compilation (1987) – keyboards, producer
The Matweeds – Rock Turns to Stone compilation (1988) – keyboards
Atomic Cocktail – Pushing The Norton: The Ace Cafe Compilation (1994) – piano
Pat Johnson – Invisible Juan (1997) – keyboards

References

1965 births
Living people
American male organists
20th-century American pianists
American male pianists
21st-century American keyboardists
21st-century American pianists
21st-century organists
20th-century American male musicians
21st-century American male musicians
Cherry Poppin' Daddies members
The Mighty Mighty Bosstones members
American organists